Staniątki  is a village in the administrative district of Gmina Niepołomice, within Wieliczka County, Lesser Poland Voivodeship, in southern Poland.

The village has an approximate population of 3,000.

The local landmark is the Benedictine monastery, which is listed as a Historic Monument of Poland.

Sports
The local football club is Czarni Staniątki. It competes in the lower leagues.

References

Villages in Wieliczka County